Thubana nardinopa is a moth in the family Lecithoceridae. It was described by Edward Meyrick in 1918. It is found in southern India.

The wingspan is about 24 mm. The forewings are fuscous with a pale ochreous spot on the costa at four-fifths. The hindwings are grey.

References

Moths described in 1918
Thubana